Central Norristown Historic District is a national historic district located in Norristown, Montgomery County, Pennsylvania. It encompasses approximately 1,900 buildings in the central business district and surrounding residential areas of Norristown.  Notable buildings include the Montgomery County Courthouse, Philadelphia and Western Railroad Station (1931), Scheidt Brewery, Montgomery County Jail, Y.M.C.A, Odd Fellows Hall, and a variety of workers' housing and imposing dwellings.

It was added to the National Register of Historic Places in 1984.

References

Historic districts in Montgomery County, Pennsylvania
Historic districts on the National Register of Historic Places in Pennsylvania
National Register of Historic Places in Montgomery County, Pennsylvania